Roderick Ross La Rocque (November 29, 1898 – October 15, 1969) was an American actor.

Biography
La Rocque was born in Chicago, Illinois to Edmund La Rocque and Ann (née Rice) La Rocque. His father was of French-Canadian descent and his mother was of Irish descent. He began appearing in stock theater at the age of seven and eventually ended up at the Essanay Studios as a teenager in Chicago where he found steady work until the studios closed. He then moved to New York City and worked on the stage until he was noticed by Samuel Goldwyn who took him to Hollywood. Over the next two decades, he appeared in films and made the transition to sound films. 

In 1927, he married Hungarian actress Vilma Bánky in a lavish, highly publicized wedding. They were married until his death in 1969. The couple had no children. He retired from movies in 1941 and became a real estate broker.

For his contribution to the film industry, La Rocque was awarded a star on the Hollywood Walk of Fame.

Partial filmography

 The Showman (1914) - Minor Role (uncredited)
 The Alster Case (1915) - Allen Longstreet
 The Little Shepherd of Bargain Row (1916)
 The Prince of Graustark (1916)
 Efficiency Edgar's Courtship (1917) - Wimple
 Filling His Own Shoes (1917) - Dick Downing
 The Dream Doll (1917) - Her Sweetheart
 Sadie Goes to Heaven (1917) - Coal Heaver
 Uneasy Money (1918) - Johnny Gates
 Ruggles of Red Gap (1918) - Belknap Jackson
 Let's Get a Divorce (1918) - Chauffeur
 The Venus Model (1918) - Paul Braddock
 Money Mad (1918) - William Gavin Jr.
 Hidden Fires (1918) - George Landis
 A Perfect 36 (1918) - O.P. Dildock
 A Perfect Lady (1918) - Bob Griswold
 Love and the Woman (1919) - Walter Pemberton
 The Trap (1919) - Doc Sloan - the Blackmailer
 Miss Crusoe (1919) - Harold Vance
 Easy to Get (1920) - Dick Elliott
 The Stolen Kiss (1920) - Dudley Hamilt
 The Garter Girl (1920) - Arthur Lyle
 The Common Sin (1920) - Hugh Stanton
 Life (1920) - Tom Burnett
 The Discarded Woman (1920) - Sam Radburn - Gold Digger
 Paying the Piper (1921) - Larry Grahame
 Suspicious Wives (1921) - Bob Standing
 Slim Shoulders (1922) - Richard Langden
 What's Wrong with the Women? (1922) - Jack Lee
 A Woman's Woman (1922) - Dean Laddbarry
 Notoriety (1922) - Arthur Beal
 The Challenge (1922) - Stanley Roberts
 Jazzmania (1923) - Jerry Langdon
 The French Doll (1923) - Pedro Carrova
 The Ten Commandments (1923) - Dan McTavish - Her Son
 Don't Call It Love (1923) - Patrick Delaney
 Phantom Justice (1924) - Kingsley
 A Society Scandal (1924) - Daniel Farr
 Triumph (1924) - King Garnet
 Code of the Sea (1924) - Bruce McDow
 Feet of Clay (1924) - Kerry Harlan
 Forbidden Paradise (1924) - Capt. Alexei Czerny
 The Golden Bed (1925) - Admah Holtz
 Night Life of New York (1925) - Ronald Bentley
 Wild, Wild Susan (1925) - Tod Waterbury
 The Coming of Amos (1925) - Amos Burden
 Braveheart (1925) - Braveheart
 Red Dice (1926) - Alan Beckwith
 Bachelor Brides (1926) - Percy Ashfield - Earl of Duncraggan
 Gigolo (1926) - Gideon Gory
 Cruise of the Jasper B (1926) - Jerry Cleggett
 Resurrection (1927) - Prince Dimitry Ivanitch Nekhludov
 The Fighting Eagle (1927) - Etienne Gerard
 Stand and Deliver (1928) - Roger Norman
 Hold 'Em Yale (1928) - Jaime Emmanuel Alvarado Montez
 Captain Swagger (1928) - Captain Swagger / Hugh Drummond
 Show People (1928) - Rod La Rocque (uncredited)
 Love Over Night (1928) - Richard Hill
 The One Woman Idea (1929) - Prince Ahmed
 The Man and the Moment (1929) - Michael Towne
 Our Modern Maidens (1929) - Abbott
 The Delightful Rogue (1929) - Lastro
 The Locked Door (1929) - Frank Devereaux
 Beau Bandit (1930, preserved Library of Congress) - Montero
 One Romantic Night (1930) - Prince Albert
 Let Us Be Gay (1930) - Bob Brown
 SOS Iceberg (1933, English-language version of SOS Eisberg with Leni Riefenstahl) - Dr. Carl Lawrence
 Mystery Woman (1935) - Jacques Benoit
 Hi, Gaucho! (1935) - Escurra, aka Captain Garcia
 Frisco Waterfront (1935) - Dan Elliott
 Taming the Wild (1936) - Dick Clayton
 The Preview Murder Mystery (1936) - Neil DuBeck / Joe Walker
 Till We Meet Again (1936) - Carl Schrottle
 The Drag-Net (1936) - Lawrence Thomas Jr.
 Clothes and the Woman (1937) - Eric Thrale
 The Shadow Strikes (1937) - Lamont Granston
 International Crime (1938) - Lamont Cranston
 The Hunchback of Notre Dame (1939) - Phillippe
 Beyond Tomorrow (1940) - Phil Hubert
 Dr. Christian Meets the Women (1940) - Prof. Kenneth Parker
 Dark Streets of Cairo (1941) - Inspector Joachim
 Meet John Doe (1941) - Ted Sheldon (final film role)

References
Notes

Bibliography

Schildgen, Rachel A. More Than a Dream: Rediscovering the Life & Films of Vilma Banky .

External links

Rod La Rocque at Virtual History
Portraits of Rod La Rocque; NY Public Library, Billy Rose collection

1898 births
1969 deaths
American male film actors
American male silent film actors
Male actors from Chicago
American people of French-Canadian descent
American people of Irish descent
20th-century American male actors